Boris Becker and Wojtek Fibak were the defending champions, but did not participate this year.

Mark Edmondson and Kim Warwick won the title, defeating Sergio Casal and Emilio Sánchez 4–6, 7–5, 7–5 in the final.

Seeds

  Joakim Nyström /  Pavel Složil (first round)
  Mark Edmondson /  Kim Warwick (champions)
  Broderick Dyke /  Wally Masur (first round)
  Jan Gunnarsson /  Michael Mortensen (first round)

Draw

Draw

External links
 Draw

1985 Grand Prix (tennis)
1985 BMW Open